Australia competed at the World Games 2017 in Wroclaw, Poland, from 20 July 2017 to 30 July 2017.

Competitors

Gymnastic

Rhythmic Gymnastics
Australia has qualified at the 2017 World Games:

Women's individual event - 1 quota

Trampoline
Australia has qualified at the 2017 World Games:

Men's Individual Double Mini Trampoline - 1 quota 
Men's Synchronized Trampoline - 1 quota
Women's Individual Double Mini Trampoline - 1 quota

Karate 

Australia competed in karate.

Korfball
Australia has qualified at the 2017 World Games in the Korfball Mixed Team event.

Fistball
Australia has qualified at the 2017 World Games in the Fistball Men Team event.

Muaythai
Australia has qualified at the 2017 World Games:

Women's -75 kg – (Anita Bcom)

Karate
Australia has qualified at the 2017 World Games:

Men's Kumite -60 kg – (Tsuneari Yahiro)
Women's Kumite -50 kg – (Maria Alexiadis)
Women's Kumite -55 kg – (T'Meika Knapp)
Women's Kumite -61 kg – (Kristina Mah)
Women's Kumite +68 kg - (Evgeniya Podborodnikova)

References 

Nations at the 2017 World Games
2017 in Australian sport
2017